Sir Andrew Motion  (born 26 October 1952) is an English poet, novelist, and biographer, who was Poet Laureate from 1999 to 2009. During the period of his laureateship, Motion founded the Poetry Archive, an online resource of poems and audio recordings of poets reading their own work. In 2012, he became President of the Campaign to Protect Rural England, taking over from Bill Bryson.

Early life

Motion was born on 26 October 1952 in London, to (Andrew) Richard Michael Motion (1921-2006), a brewer at Ind Coope, and (Catherine) Gillian (née Bakewell; 1928–1978). Richard Motion was from a brewing dynasty; his grandfather founded Taylor Walker, but this had been absorbed by Ind Coope by Richard Motion's time. The Motion family were wealthy armigers who lived at Upton House, Banbury, Oxfordshire, and were prominent in the local area; Richard Motion's grandfather Andrew Richard Motion was a Justice of the Peace for Essex, Oxfordshire and Warwickshire, who had worked his way up from being a brewery labourer in the East End of London to ownership of his own successful brewery. When his children had grown up and married, he sold the Upton House estate and went to live at Stisted Hall, in Essex.

When Motion was 12 years old, the family moved to Glebe House at Stisted, near Braintree in Essex, where Richard Motion's grandparents had previously lived at Stisted Hall, by that time converted into a home for the elderly. Motion went to boarding school from the age of seven joined by his younger brother. Most of his friends were from the school and so when Motion was in the village he spent a lot of time on his own. He began to have an interest and affection for the countryside and he went for walks with a pet dog. Later he went to Radley College, where, in the sixth form, he encountered Peter Way, an inspiring English teacher who introduced him to poetry – first Hardy, then Philip Larkin, W. H. Auden, Heaney, Hughes, Wordsworth and Keats.

When Motion was 17 years old, his mother had a horse riding accident and suffered a serious head injury requiring a life-saving neurosurgery operation. She regained some speech, but she was severely paralysed and remained in and out of coma for nine years. She died in 1978 and her husband died of cancer in 2006. Motion has said that he wrote to keep his memory of his mother alive. When Motion was about 18 years old he moved away from the village to study English at University College, Oxford; however, since then he has remained in contact with the village to visit the church graveyard, where his parents are buried, and also to see his brother, who lives nearby. At University he studied at weekly sessions with W. H. Auden, whom he greatly admired. Motion won the university's Newdigate Prize and graduated with a first class honours degree. This was followed by an MLitt on the poetry of Edward Thomas.

Career
Between 1976 and 1980, Motion taught English at the University of Hull and while there, at age 24, he had his first volume of poetry published. At Hull he met university librarian and poet Philip Larkin. Motion was later appointed as one of Larkin's literary executors, which would privilege Motion's role as his biographer following Larkin's death in 1985. In Philip Larkin: A Writer's Life, Motion says that at no time during their nine-year friendship did they discuss writing his biography and it was Larkin's longtime companion Monica Jones who requested it. He reports how, as executor, he rescued many of Larkin's papers from imminent destruction following his friend's death. His 1993 biography of Larkin, which won the Whitbread Prize for Biography, was responsible for bringing about a substantial revision of Larkin's reputation.

Motion was editorial director and poetry editor at Chatto & Windus (1983–89); he edited the Poetry Society's Poetry Review from 1980 to 1982 and succeeded Malcolm Bradbury as professor of creative writing at the University of East Anglia. He is now on the faculty at the Johns Hopkins Writing Seminars.

Laureateship
Motion was appointed Poet Laureate on 1 May 1999, following the death of Ted Hughes, the previous incumbent. The Nobel Prize-winning Northern Irish poet and translator Seamus Heaney had ruled himself out for the post. Breaking with the tradition of the laureate retaining the post for life, Motion stipulated that he would stay for only ten years. The yearly stipend of £200 was increased to £5,000 and he received the customary butt of sack.
He wanted to write "poems about things in the news, and commissions from people or organisations involved with ordinary life," rather than be seen a 'courtier'. So, he wrote "for the TUC about liberty, about homelessness for the Salvation Army, about bullying for ChildLine, about the foot and mouth outbreak for the Today programme, about the Paddington rail disaster, the 11 September attacks and Harry Patch for the BBC, and more recently about shell shock for the charity Combat Stress, and climate change for the song cycle he finished for Cambridge University with Peter Maxwell Davies."

On 14 March 2002, as part of the 'Re-weaving Rainbows' event of National Science Week 2002, Motion unveiled a blue plaque on the front wall of 28 St Thomas Street, Southwark, to commemorate the sharing of lodgings there by John Keats and Henry Stephens while they were medical students at Guy's and St Thomas' Hospital in 1815–16.

In 2003, Motion wrote Regime change, a poem in protest at the Invasion of Iraq from the point of view of Death walking the streets during the conflict, and in 2005, Spring Wedding in honour of the wedding of the Prince of Wales to Camilla Parker Bowles. Commissioned to write in the honour of 109-year-old Harry Patch, the last surviving "Tommy" to have fought in World War I, Motion composed a five-part poem, read and received by Patch at the Bishop's Palace in Wells in 2008.

As laureate, he also founded the Poetry Archive, an on-line library of historic and contemporary recordings of poets reciting their own work.

Motion remarked that he found some of the duties attendant to the post of poet laureate difficult and onerous and that the appointment had been "very, very damaging to [his] work". The appointment of Motion met with criticism from some quarters. As he prepared to stand down from the job, Motion published an article in The Guardian that concluded, "To have had 10 years working as laureate has been remarkable. Sometimes it's been remarkably difficult, the laureate has to take a lot of flak, one way or another. More often it has been remarkably fulfilling. I'm glad I did it, and I'm glad I'm giving it up – especially since I mean to continue working for poetry."

Motion spent his last day as Poet Laureate holding a creative writing class at his alma mater, Radley College, before giving a poetry reading and thanking Peter Way, the man who taught him English at Radley, for making him who he was. Carol Ann Duffy succeeded him as Poet Laureate on 1 May 2009.

Post-laureateship
Motion is chairman of the Arts Council of England's literature panel (appointed 1996) and is also a Fellow of the Royal Society of Literature. In 2003, he became professor of creative writing at Royal Holloway, University of London. Since July 2009, Motion has been Chairman of the Museums, Libraries and Archives Council (MLA) appointed by the Department for Culture, Media and Sport. He is also a vice-president of the Friends of the British Library, a charity which provides funding support to the British Library. He was knighted in the 2009 Queen's Birthday Honours list. He has been a member of English Heritage's Blue Plaques Panel since 2008.

Motion was selected as jury chair for the Man Booker Prize 2010 and in March 2010, he announced that he was working with publishers Jonathan Cape on a sequel to Robert Louis Stevenson's Treasure Island. Entitled Silver, the story is set a generation on from the original book and was published in March 2012. In July 2010, Motion returned to Kingston-upon-Hull for the annual Humber Mouth literature festival and taking part in the Larkin 25 festival commemorating the 25th anniversary of Philip Larkin's death. In his capacity as Larkin's biographer and as a former lecturer in English at the University of Hull, Motion named an East Yorkshire Motor Services bus Philip Larkin. Motion's debut play Incoming, about the war in Afghanistan, premièred at the High Tides Festival in Halesworth, Suffolk in May 2011. Motion also featured in Jamie's Dream School in 2011 as the poetry teacher.

In June 2012, he became the President of the Campaign to Protect Rural England. In March 2014 he was elected an Honorary Fellow at Homerton College, Cambridge.

Motion won the 2015 Ted Hughes Award for new work in poetry for the radio programme Coming Home. The production featured poetry by Motion based on recordings he made of British soldiers returning from the wars in Iraq and Afghanistan.

In 2017 Motion moved to Baltimore, Maryland to take up a post at the Writing Seminars as a Homewood Professor of the Arts at Johns Hopkins University.

Work
Motion has said of himself: "My wish to write a poem is inseparable from my wish to explain something to myself." His work combines lyrical and narrative aspects in a "postmodern-romantic sensibility". Motion says that he aims to write in clear language without tricks.

The Independent describes the stalwart poet as the "charming and tireless defender of the art form". Motion has won the Arvon Prize, the John Llewellyn Rhys Prize, Eric Gregory Award, Whitbread Prize for Biography and the Dylan Thomas Prize.

Motion took part in the Bush Theatre's 2011 project Sixty-Six Books, writing and performing a piece based upon a book of the King James Bible.

Personal life
Motion's marriage to Joanna Powell ended in 1983. He was married to Jan Dalley from 1985 to 2009, divorcing after a seven-year separation. They had one son born in 1986 and twins, a son and a daughter, born in 1988. In 2010 he married Kyeong-Soo Kim. He currently lives part of the year in Baltimore, Maryland, in the United States.

Selected honours and awards
 1975: won the Newdigate prize for Oxford undergraduate poetry
 1976: Eric Gregory Award
 1981: wins Arvon Foundation's International Poetry Competition with The Letter
 1984:  John Llewellyn Rhys Prize for Dangerous Play: Poems 1974–1984
 1987: Somerset Maugham Award for The Lamberts
 1987:  Dylan Thomas Prize for Natural Causes
 1999: appointed Poet Laureate for ten years
 1994: Philip Larkin: A Writer’s Life, Whitbread Prize for Biography
 2009:  Knight Bachelor
 2014:  Wilfred Owen Poetry Award

Bibliography

Poetry 
Poems
 1972: Goodnestone: A Sequence (in Workshop Poets No. 7). Workshop Press
 1976: Inland. Cygnet Press

Collections
 1978: The Pleasure Steamers. Carcanet
 1981: Independence. Salamander Press
 1983: Secret Narratives. Salamander Press
 1984: Dangerous Play: Poems 1974–1984. Salamander Press / Penguin
 1987: Natural Causes. Chatto & Windus
 1988: Two Poems. Words Ltd
 1991: Love in a Life. Faber and Faber
 1994: The Price of Everything. Faber and Faber
 1997: Salt Water Faber and Faber
 1998: Selected Poems 1976–1997. Faber and Faber
 2001: A Long Story. The Old School Press
 2002: Public Property. Faber and Faber
 2009: The Cinder Path. Faber and Faber
 2012: The Customs House. Faber and Faber
 2015: Peace Talks. Faber and Faber
 2015: Coming Home. Fine Press Poetry
 2017: Coming in to Land: Selected Poems, 1975–2015. Ecco Press
 2018: Essex Clay. Faber and Faber
 2020:  Randomly Moving Particles. Faber and Faber

List of poems

Criticism
 1980: The Poetry of Edward Thomas.   Routledge & Kegan Paul
 1982: Philip Larkin. (Contemporary Writers series) Methuen
 1986: Elizabeth Bishop. (Chatterton Lectures on an English Poet)
 1998: Sarah Raphael: Strip!. Marlborough Fine Art (London)
 2008: Ways of Life: On Places, Painters and Poets. Faber and Faber

Biography
 1986: The Lamberts: George, Constant and Kit. Chatto & Windus
 1993: Philip Larkin: A Writer's Life. Faber and Faber
 1997: Keats: A Biography. Faber and Faber

Memoirs
 2006: In the Blood: A Memoir of my Childhood. Faber and Faber

Fiction
 1989: The Pale Companion. Penguin
 1991: Famous for the Creatures. Viking
 2003: The Invention of Dr Cake. Faber and Faber
 2000: Wainewright the Poisoner: The Confessions of Thomas Griffiths Wainewright (biographical novel)
 2012: Silver. Jonathan Cape
 2015: The New World. Crown

Edited works, introductions, and forewords
 1981: Selected Poems: William Barnes. Penguin Classics
 1982: The Penguin Book of Contemporary British Poetry with Blake Morrison. Penguin
 1994: Thomas Hardy: Selected Poems. Dent
 1993: New Writing 2 (With Malcolm Bradbury). Minerva in association with the British Council
 1994: New Writing 3 (With Candice Rodd). Minerva in association with the British Council
 1997: Penguin Modern Poets: Volume 11  with Michael Donaghy and Hugo Williams. Penguin
 1998: Take 20: New Writing. University of East Anglia
 1999: Verses of the Poets Laureate: From John Dryden to Andrew Motion. With Hilary Laurie. Orion.
 1999: Babel: New Writing by the University of East Anglia's MA Writers. University of East Anglia.
 2001: Firsthand: The New Anthology of Creative Writing from the University of East Anglia. University of East Anglia
 2002: Paper Scissors Stone: New Writing from the MA in Creative Writing at UEA. University of East Anglia.
 2001: The Creative Writing Coursebook: Forty Authors Share Advice and Exercises for Fiction & Poetry. With Julia Bell. Macmillan
 2000: John Keats: Poems Selected by Andrew Motion. Faber and Faber
 2001: Here to Eternity: An Anthology of Poetry. Faber and Faber
 2002: The Mays Literary Anthology; Guest editor. Varsity Publications
 2003: 101 Poems Against War . Faber and Faber (Afterword)
 2003: First World War Poems. Faber and Faber
 2006: Collins Rhyming Dictionary. Collins
 2007: Bedford Square 2: New Writing from the Royal Holloway Creative Writing Programme. John Murray Ltd.

References

External links

 Profile and poems written and audio at the Poetry Archive
 Profile at Poets.org
 National Portrait Gallery portraits
 
 Guardian profile 13 December 2005 "Andrew Motion: Mr Speaker".  Guardian "Andrew Motion on war poetry". Interview and reading. 27 July 2009 (Video, 8 mins)
 BBC profile. BBC interview "Andrew Motion on being Poet Laureate" (Video, 4 mins). BBC interview "Andrew Motion's Hindu Wood Carving" (Video 4 mins)
 A chapter from Keats, about John Keats, Fanny Brawne, and his poem for her, "Bright Star"
 , Andrew Motion's Romanes Lecture (2011) at Oxford University (video)
Papers of Andrew Motion at the British Library

1952 births
Living people
20th-century English novelists
20th-century English poets
20th-century biographers
20th-century English male writers
21st-century British novelists
21st-century British poets
21st-century biographers
21st-century English male writers
Academics of Royal Holloway, University of London
Academics of the University of East Anglia
Academics of the University of Hull
Alumni of University College, Oxford
British Poets Laureate
English biographers
English book editors
Fellows of the Royal Society of Literature
Knights Bachelor
People educated at Radley College
People from Braintree, Essex
The New York Review of Books people